Irish Law is a mountain located in North Ayrshire, Scotland near the town of Largs.

It has a complex geology, consisting of igneous rocks and vent.

Walkers frequently visit Irish Law to see the wreckage of the downed plane British European Airways Flight S200P which is located on the north side of the hill's slopes.

The mountain has no paths leading to it, but it is approximately 1 mile from an access road running from Largs to the A760 road.

References 

Mountains and hills of North Ayrshire